This is a list of all the publications printed in Guayaquil which report both national and international news.

 Diario Expreso de Guayaquil
Comunidad En Guayaquil
 Del Diario Extra
 Diario El Meridiano
 Diario El Metro de Guayaquil
 Diario Super
 Diario El Telegrafo
 El Financiero
 La Segunda del Meridiano
 El Universo

References

Newspapers published in Ecuador
Spanish-language newspapers
Mass media in Guayaquil
Lists of newspapers